Raja Farzan Khan (Punjabi) (born 12 May 1995) is a Pakistani cricketer. He made his List A debut for Lahore Whites in the 2018–19 Quaid-e-Azam One Day Cup on 22 September 2018. He made his Twenty20 debut for the Lahore Qalandars in the 2018 Abu Dhabi T20 Trophy on 4 October 2018. He was picked by the Lahore Qalandars for the 2020 Pakistan Super League. He was picked from their Player Development Program.

Note

References

External links
 

1995 births
Living people
Pakistani cricketers
Lahore cricketers
Lahore Qalandars cricketers